John C. Rollins was a state legislator in Arkansas. He represented Ashley County in the Arkansas House of Representatives in 1873. He was a Republican. He was one of the African Americans who served in Arkansas’ legislature during and after the Reconstruction era until the 1970s when voting restrictions imposed by Democrats during the Jim Crow era were lifted in the Civil Rights era.

See also
African-American officeholders during and following the Reconstruction era

References

Republican Party members of the Arkansas House of Representatives
African-American politicians during the Reconstruction Era
19th-century American politicians
Year of birth missing
Year of death missing
People from Ashley County, Arkansas